Benjamin Jaffe (born January 26, 1971) is the creative director of Preservation Hall and plays tuba and double bass with the Preservation Hall Jazz Band.

Early life and education
He is the son of Preservation Hall's former managers, Allan Jaffe and Sandra Jaffe. Jaffe grew up in New Orleans' French Quarter,  two blocks from Preservation Hall.  His father, Allan, in addition to managing the Preservation Hall Jazz Band and Preservation Hall, played tuba with the band as well.  From birth, Ben was brought on tour with the band during their international tours. Ben’s early musical memories are marching alongside his father in Mardi Gras Parades and jazz funeral processions.  He began playing in grammar school at McDonogh 15 School for the Creative Arts in the French Quarter.  During high school at NOCCA, he studied upright bass under Walter Payton. After high school, Ben attended Oberlin College where he received a degree in bass performance in 1992.

Career
Following his graduation, Ben returned to New Orleans, resumed his father's position as manager of the Preservation Hall venue and joined the Preservation Hall Jazz Band on tour playing bass. Benjamin produced a number of albums for the Preservation Hall band, and most recently co-produced the band's first album of original compositions "That's It," alongside My Morning Jacket frontman Jim James.

Benjamin serves as the Chairman of the Board of the Preservation Hall Foundation, the charitable non-profit that serves the mission to "protect, preserve and perpetuate New Orleans jazz music and culture."

In episode 6 of "Foo Fighters: Sonic Highways," Dave Grohl interviews Ben about his parents' role in preserving New Orleans jazz, the history of Preservation Hall and Jaffe's current role as director, operating the hall.

Discography

Preservation Hall Jazz Band

In The Sweet Bye and Bye (1986)
Because of You (1988)
Songs of New Orleans (1991)
Shake That Thing (1994)
The Hurricane Sessions (1997)
New Orleans Preservation Volume 1 (1999) 
St. Peter Street Serenade (2000)
Preservation: An Album to Benefit Preservation Hall and The Preservation Hall Music Outreach Program (2001) 
St. Peter & 57th (2002) 
That's It (2003)
So It Is (2007)

Collaborations
Our New Orleans (2005)
Goin' Home: A Tribute to Fats Domino (2007)
Death of a Street Singer by Jeremy Lyons and The Deltabilly Boys (2007)
New Orleans Jazz by Lars Edegran (2008)
New Orlean's Seventh Ward Griot by Carl LeBlanc (2008)
Down in New Orleans by The Blind Boys of Alabama (2008)
Magnificent Beast by MarchFourth Marching Band (2011)
Bad as Me by Tom Waits (2011)
Sonic Highways by Foo Fighters (2014)
Kokomo Kidd by Guy Davis (2015)
Shadowbox by Beats Antique (2016)

References

1971 births
Oberlin College alumni
Musicians from New Orleans
American chairpersons of corporations
Living people
Preservation Hall Jazz Band members
Oberlin Jazz Ensemble members